Kovrizhinskaya is a rural locality (a village) in Tarnogskoye Rural Settlement, Tarnogsky District, Vologda Oblast, Russia. The population was 10 as of 2002.

Geography 
Kovrizhinskaya is located 33 km northeast of Tarnogsky Gorodok (the district's administrative centre) by road. Mitroshinskaya is the nearest rural locality.

References 

Rural localities in Tarnogsky District